Allan W. Martin (October 5, 1874 – August 31, 1942) was a Vermont businessman and elected official.  A native of Wisconsin, he served as a Republican member of the Vermont House of Representatives for two terms and the Vermont Senate for one.

Biography
Martin was born on October 5, 1874, in Beaver Dam, Wisconsin, the son of William D. and Myra (McCoy) Martin.  He was raised in Wilmette, Illinois, and attended the public schools of Wilmette.

Career
Martin moved to Hartland, Vermont, in 1904, and was a manufacturer of woodwork, including doors, sashes, blinds, boxes, shingles, and shipping crates.  A Republican, he served in town offices including auditor and school board member.  He was a member of the Vermont House of Representatives from 1923 to 1927. He was a member of the Vermont Senate from 1927 to 1929.

Death and burial
Martin died in Windsor on August 31, 1942, and was buried at Hartland Village Cemetery.

Family
Martin was married to Ella (Carpenter) Martin.  Their children included Alonzo, Azra, Ella Josephine, and William David.

References

Sources

Internet

Newspapers

Books

External links

Politicians from Beaver Dam, Wisconsin
Republican Party Vermont state senators
Republican Party members of the Vermont House of Representatives
1874 births
1942 deaths
Burials in Vermont